Fusilladeplaats Rozenoord is a World War II memorial in the Dutch city of Amsterdam.

'Fusilladeplaats' might be translated into English as 'firing squad place'.

Between 18 January and 14 April 1945, German occupation forces shot dead more than 100 Dutch civilians at Fusilladeplaats Rozenoord (at least that many have been identified, several of them resistance fighters). Those events are commemorated 4 May every year. It seems that no-one ever faced trial for those crimes.

The inscription on the memorial plaque reads:

An English translation:

In 2014, Dutch artist and sculptor  designed another memorial for Fusilladeplaats Rozenoord. It consists of an arrangement of empty chairs on concrete plates with the names of the known victims. There is also one plate for the unknown victims. In 2018, research delivered six other names of victims, so six extra chairs were placed. This monument is situated in Amstelpark.

References

World War II memorials in the Netherlands